Chaima Ben Mohamed (born 11 September 1997) is a Tunisian footballer who plays as a midfielder for AS Banque de l'Habitat and the Tunisia women's national team.

Club career
Ben Mohamed has played for AS Banque de l'Habitat in Tunisia.

International career
Ben Mohamed has capped for Tunisia at senior level, including in a 2–0 friendly away win over Jordan on 13 June 2021.

International goals
Scores and results list Tunisia's goal tally first

See also
List of Tunisia women's international footballers

References

External links

1997 births
Living people
Tunisian women's footballers
Women's association football midfielders
Tunisia women's international footballers
20th-century Tunisian women
21st-century Tunisian women